Bucculatrix angustata is a moth in the family Bucculatricidae. It is found in North America, where it has been recorded from the eastern United States to Texas, Utah and Washington. The species was first described by Heinrich Frey and Jacob Boll in 1876.

The wingspan is 7–9 mm. The forewings are pale whitish brown to dark brown with a white longitudinal streak from the base to about half the wing length. The hindwings are pale brownish grey. Adults have been recorded on wing from April to October.

The larvae feed on Aster, Solidago and rarely Erigeron species. They mine the leaves of their host plant. The mine starts as a long, linear, gradually widening track. The larva leaves this mine, to form a second mine which is trumpet-shaped. Pupation takes place in a white cocoon.

Etymology
The species name is derived from Latin angustata (meaning narrow).

References

Natural History Museum Lepidoptera generic names catalog

Bucculatricidae
Moths described in 1876
Taxa named by Heinrich Frey
Moths of North America